Herman Verelst (1641 in Dordrecht – 1702 in London), was a Dutch Golden Age painter.

Biography
Herman was the son of Pieter Hermansz Verelst and his wife, who grew up in The Hague. He was the second of three sons who became painters: the other two were Simon and Johannes.

He became a pupil in the Confrerie Pictura in 1663, at the same time as his brother Simon. The brotherhood was founded by his father, who taught all three sons. In 1667 Verelst married, living in Kalverstraat, a woman from Venice, living at Prinsengracht. He had two children baptized in the nearby Westerkerk. In those days he portrayed Johan de Witt (who came from Dordrecht) and his wife Wendela Bicker.

Verelst is known for portraits and still life paintings. He worked in Amsterdam, Italy, Ljubljana, Paris and Vienna before moving to London in 1683, where his brother was very successful. It is suggested Louis Michiel was his pupil. Some of his children, Cornelis and Maria Verelst, also became painters.

Family tree

References

External links
Herman Verelst on Artnet

1641 births
1702 deaths
Dutch Golden Age painters
Dutch male painters
Artists from Dordrecht
Painters from The Hague
Dutch portrait painters